Coely Mbueno (born in 1994), performing as Coely, is a Belgian urban artist.

Biography
Coely Mbueno was born in Antwerp in 1994 to Congolese parents. Already at a young age, she started singing in a church choir directed by her mother. She started rapping when she was 14 years old, at first covering Nicki Minaj in a local youth club.

She played as an opening act for Kanye West, De La Soul and Kendrick Lamar, and performed at all major Belgian festivals, and international festivals like Glastonbury.

Discography
2013: RAAH The Soulful Yeah’t (EP)
2016: Different Waters (full length album): reached #8 on the Flemish Ultratop album charts, #61 on the Walloon Ultratop, and #138 in the Netherlands

Singles
2012: Ain't Chasing Pavements
2013: Nothing On Me, All I Do
2014: My Tomorrow
2016: Don't Care, reached #1 in De Afrekening, hitlist of Studio Brussel
2017: Wake Up Call, Celebrate, No Way
2018: Hush

As a featured artist
More Mess by Kungs, a top 20 hit in France
Magic Carpet by Dvtch Norris

Awards
2017: Music Industry Awards: won Solo Woman Award, and Urban Award
2017: Female Belgian singer of the year at HUMO's Pop Poll
2018: Ultima award for Music from the Flemish Ministry of Culture
2018: Music Industry Awards: nominated for Solo Woman and for Urban

Notes

External links

1994 births
Belgian rappers
Living people